Douglas Gonçalves dos Santos (born 2 February 1991 in Arapiraca) is a Brazilian footballer who plays as a defender.

Career

VSI Tampa Bay
After spending time with Clube Náutico Capibaribe in the Campeonato Brasileiro Série B and Belo Jardim Futebol Clube in the local leagues in Brazil, Dos Santos played for the USL-PDL Club the Ocala Stampede in 2012. He then signed on with the expansion franchise in the USL Pro, the third-tier of American soccer, VSI Tampa Bay FC in 2013. On 30 March 2013 Douglas made his debut for Tampa Bay against other new expansion franchise Phoenix FC in which he came on in the 53rd minute as Tampa Bay suffered a 1–0 defeat. On April 2, 2013, Dos Santos was credited with the first assist in VSI Tampa Bay FC history, setting up teammate Antonio Neto for the game-winning goal vs the Los Angeles Blues.

Career statistics

Club
Statistics accurate as of 20 December 2013

References

1991 births
Living people
Brazilian footballers
Brazilian expatriate footballers
Clube Náutico Capibaribe players
Ocala Stampede players
VSI Tampa Bay FC players
Association football midfielders
Sportspeople from Alagoas
Expatriate soccer players in the United States
USL League Two players
USL Championship players
Brazilian expatriate sportspeople in the United States
Major Arena Soccer League players
Chicago Mustangs (2012–) players
Harrisburg Heat (MASL) players
St. Louis Ambush (2013–) players
Belo Jardim Futebol Clube players
Milwaukee Wave players